I. I. Chundrigar Road, previously known as McLeod Road, is a road located in central business district of Karachi, Pakistan, and is named after former Pakistani Prime Minister Ibrahim Ismail Chundrigar. The road serves as the spine of Pakistan's largest financial centre, and is frequently referred to as "Pakistan's Wall Street". It is oriented on an east-west basis and links Dr. Ziauddin Ahmed Road in the east to Merewether Tower in the west.

The Karachi Stock Exchange, now consolidated as part of the Pakistan Stock Exchange, is headquartered here along with the largest banks, namely Habib Bank, United Bank, National Bank, Standard Chartered's Pakistani subsidiary and the State Bank – the nation's central bank. It is also the headquarters of media companies Hum Network and Geo News.

History 
The road was originally named McLeod Road, in honour of John McLeod, Deputy Collector of Customs in Karachi in the 1850s. Another theory suggests it was named in honour of James John McLeod Innes, a recipient of the Victoria Cross, for his services to the Crown during the 1857 Mutiny. Several cotton warehouses were established facing the railway line behind the street during a cotton boom in the region after the American Civil War, with their offices along the street itself. By the 1870s, a number of European banks and companies were established along the street. In the 1870s, a small railway station was built along the southern edge of the road, which was upgraded in the 1880s, and again in 1935 with the construction of the McLeod Station, now the Karachi City railway station.

In 1963, the Habib Bank Plaza was built along the street, which remained the tallest building of Pakistan until 2005, when the MCB Tower, which was also built on the road, was completed. On 9 November 1969, the street was renamed Ibrahim Ismail Chundrigar Road.

Gallery 
The following are heritage buildings along I.I. Chundrigar Road which are protected by the Government of Sindh.

See also
List of streets of Karachi

References

External links 

Economy of Karachi
Central business districts in Pakistan
Streets in Karachi